Mark VI of Alexandria may refer to:

 Patriarch Mark VI of Alexandria, Greek Patriarch of Alexandria in 1459–1484
 Pope Mark VI of Alexandria, ruled in 1646–1656